Big Slough in Kingsbury County, South Dakota is a local marsh, south-east of De Smet.

History
This was the slough that Laura Ingalls Wilder wrote about in her books, "  By the Shores of Silver Lake" and "The Long Winter."

Landforms of Kingsbury County, South Dakota
Marshes of South Dakota